Auriscalpium dissectum is a species of fungus in the family Auriscalpiaceae of the Russulales order. Found in Zaire, it was described as new to science in the year 1979.

References

External links

Fungi described in 1979
Fungi of Africa
Russulales